Sarnia's Chemical Valley and the surrounding area are home to sixty-two facilities and refineries.  A widely quoted 2007 Ecojustice Canada report showed those large industrial facilities located within 25 km of Sarnia, Ontario, Canada emitted more than 131,000 tonnes of air pollution in 2005, a toxic load of more than 1,800 kilograms per resident.

Particulate Matter

In January 2011, the Sarnia Observer noted "Sarnia had by far the highest levels of fine particulate matter recorded at any of the province's 40 monitoring stations, with significantly sootier air than Windsor, Hamilton, Kingston, and Chatham".  In September 2011, the World Health Organization reported that "While Canada ranks third in the world when it comes to air quality, Sarnia was ranked the worst city in the country, with the most particulate matter per cubic metre of air."  Pamela Calvert's 2006 documentary on the Aamjiwnaang First Nation, The Beloved Community, details the startling revelation that the Aamjiwmnaang birth rate of males to females is 1 to 2, the lowest live male birth rate in Canada. In addition to the detrimental effect on birth rates among the First Nation peoples of the area, there is also correlation between Sarnia and cancer rates among men—34% higher overall cancer rate than the provincial average, a lung cancer rate that is 50% higher, a mesothelioma rate five times higher and an asbestosis rate nine times higher.

On a positive note, however, the Observer also stated in the January 2011 article that, "despite having what has been described as the 'dirtiest air in the province,' Sarnia has reduced its nitrogen dioxide, carbon monoxide and sulfur dioxide problems by 30% in the last three years" and "Environment Minister John Wilkinson said it's the first time in the report's 39-year history pollutants have not exceeded provincial monitoring standards. That translated into a record low of three smog advisories and five smog days in 2009."

Additionally, a Lambton County document indicates that in 2005, up to fifty-five percent of ground level ozone and fine particulate matter emissions come from neighboring US facilities.  In fact, the 2005 study "Transboundary Air Pollution in Ontario" states that "Long-range transport and transboundary flow of air pollutants play a significant role in air quality considerations on a regional scale."

Water Pollution
Water pollution is a serious concern in Sarnia.  A June 2003 Ryerson University study concluded that the main source of water pollution in the St. Clair River occurs at the Sarnia Water Pollution Control Centre (WPCC) due to chemical spills and ship emissions.  The study goes on to say that "A significant reduction of the pollution to the St. Clair River will only be achieved by improving the quality of the Sarnia WPCC effluent." In 2008, the city resolved to replace the aging sewer pumps that controlled the effluent.  Minutes of a meeting between Mayor Mike Bradley and Sarnia City Council state "The cost of repairing the raw sewage pumps is a significant portion of purchasing a new unit. However based on the performance of the existing units over the past 8 years, City staff prefers to look at other manufacturers for replacing the existing Fairbanks-Morse pumps as they require their second rebuilding."  In 2010, though, the Water Distribution Report indicated that "no filter effluent turbidity exceeded the prescribed test result for adverse reporting..."  Further, the Water Distribution Report concluded that "Note- No inorganic or organic parameters exceeded half the standard prescribed in Schedule 2 of the Ontario Drinking Water Quality Standards."

Plans for Pollution Improvement
As a city, Sarnia is committed to the improvement of its pollution, both air and water. The following statements from City of Sarnia Website succinctly establish this position: "As part of the City's commitment to monitoring and improving the environment, the City Council has established a number of committees to advise Council as well as appointing City representatives to outside committees who have an interest in the environment and the preservation of habitats" and "The City of Sarnia has adopted a Smog Alert Response Plan in support of the Ontario Government's Air Quality Ontario initiative. The initiative is to provide better and more timely air quality information to the Ontario public. City staff are notified of smog alerts and implement the air quality improvement strategies outlined in the City's Smog Alert Plan.".  In 2009, Sarnia had a record low three smog advisories and only five smog days. The County of Lambton reports that from 1995–2008, Sarnia experienced a high of thirteen smog advisories and forty-six smog days, both in 2005.

Shale Gas Controversy
Despite all Sarnia has done to improve its pollution, there are plans to bring shale gas into Chemical Valley by pipeline in mid-2013.  This process is environmentally divisive because it necessitates hydraulic fracturing to extract the gas.  Hydraulic fracturing involves injecting a liquid into rock, shale or otherwise, at very high pressure to extract fossil fuels such as the aforementioned shale gas.  Environmentalists oppose hydraulic fracturing since it can damage water supplies and produce long lasting toxic deposits, either in the waste water produced, air particulates, or solid forms of the gels or chemicals mixed with the water as part of the process. Supporters tout the employment benefits to an already sagging Sarnia petrochemical industry. Business interests seem to have won the argument since the shale gas is expected to flow into Chemical Valley this year, notably to Nova Chemicals.

Warning Sirens
Due to the risk of hazardous materials incidents (chemical emergencies) occurring in the industrial corridor south of Sarnia, four sirens have been placed in Sarnia south of Wellington Street, three more on nearby the Aamjiwnaang First Nation reserve, three in Corunna, and one in Point Edward. In the event of an emergency requiring immediate action by the public, the sirens are sounded for a three-minute period, serving as an alert to the public to seek shelter indoors and to tune to a local radio station for updated instructions. These sirens are tested (and can be heard) every Monday at 12:30pm to ensure proper functioning.  An emergency Command Centre located at the Sarnia Police Station can coordinate deployments of emergency responders during hazardous materials incidents.

References

Sarnia
Environment of Canada
Chemical industry
Chemical industry in Sarnia